Macrocoma saudica is a species of leaf beetle of Saudi Arabia and Egypt, described by  in 1996.

References

saudica
Beetles of Asia
Insects of the Arabian Peninsula
Beetles described in 1996